Juan Soto Ivars (1985 in Águilas) is a Spanish novelist and columnist.

He is the author of the novels Ajedrez para un detective novato (2013), Siberia (2012) and La conjetura de Perelman (2011). He co-edited the short story collection Mi madre es un pez (2011) with Sergi Bellver. He contributes regularly to Vice, Primera Línea, El Confidencial, Revista Tiempo, Ling and other magazines. For two years he was the director of the newsletter El Crítico created by Juan Carlos Suñén. In 2011 he co-founded the literary movement Nuevo Drama.

Works
Novels
 Ajedrez para un detective novato (2013)
 Siberia (2012)
 La conjetura de Perelman (2011)

Books edited
 He co-edited the short story anthology Mi madre es un pez (2011) with Sergi Bellver

References 

1985 births
Murcian writers
People from Águilas
Living people
Spanish male short story writers
Spanish short story writers